Red Cliff Bridge is a cantilevered steel arch bridge located about  southwest of the town of Red Cliff, Colorado, one of Colorado's iconic bridges. The bridge carries U.S. Highway 24 over the Eagle River, as well as a county road, and the former Union Pacific Railroad track that heads south toward Tennessee Pass and the city of Leadville. One of only two steel arch bridges within Colorado, Red Cliff Bridge has been listed on the National Register of Historic Places since 1985 and is the state's only cantilevered steel arch bridge.

The bridge was designed by King Burghardt, an engineer at the Colorado Department of Highways, and built by contractor P.M. Kenney in 1940, using steel components fabricated by the Minnesota-Moline Power Implement Company. Construction was difficult, with workers hanging over a  drop while working in temperatures that sometimes dipped below . Burghardt wrote in his journal, "In the morning, each gang was lifted to its scaffold on a platform hung from the high line. They took their lunches with them and spent the entire day in the air with the winter wind continually blowing up the canyon."

After more than 60 years since its construction, the bridge had deteriorated to the point that major restoration work was required. The work was completed between March and November 2004 at a cost of $3.6 million, with  $1.6 million coming from the Federal Highway Administration. The bridge deck was replaced and widened and much of the steel was repainted. However, because of the bridge's historic status, care was taken to maintain the visual aesthetic. The rehabilitation effort won the 2005 National Steel Bridge Alliance Prize Bridge Award for the year's best reconstructed bridge.

See also
List of bridges in the United States by height
National Register of Historic Places listings in Eagle County, Colorado

References

External links

 Preserving Red Cliff Arch, Federal Highway Administration

Bridges of the United States Numbered Highway System
Open-spandrel deck arch bridges in the United States
Road bridges on the National Register of Historic Places in Colorado
Transportation buildings and structures in Eagle County, Colorado
Bridges completed in 1940
U.S. Route 24
National Register of Historic Places in Eagle County, Colorado
Steel bridges in the United States
Cantilever bridges in the United States